The 2nd National Congress of the Kuomintang was the second national congress of the Kuomintang, held in 1–19 January 1926 at Kwangchow, Kwangtung, Republic of China.

Results
Chiang Kai-shek was elected to the Central Executive Committee of the Kuomintang for the very first time.

See also
 Kuomintang

References

1926 conferences
1926 in China
National Congresses of the Kuomintang
Politics of the Republic of China (1912–1949)